Anatoly V. Zayats  (born 24 August 1963) is a British experimental physicist of Ukrainian origin known for his work in nanophotonics, plasmonics, metamaterials and applied nanotechnology.  He is currently a Chair in Experimental Physics and the head of the Photonics & Nanotechnology Group at King's College London. He is a co-director of the London Centre for Nanotechnology and the London Institute for Advanced Light Technologies

Education
Zayats was educated at the Moscow Institute of Physics and Technology.

Career and research 
Zayats’s current research interests are in areas of nanophotonics, plasmonics and metamaterials, optical spin-orbit effects, nonlinear and ultrafast optics and spectroscopy, scanning probe microscopy and optical properties of surfaces, thin films, semiconductors and low-dimensional structures.

Zayats led the EPSRC Programme Grant Active Plasmonics (2009-2015) and currently leads  the Engineering and Physical Sciences Research Council funded programme grant Reactive Plasmonics(2015-2021). This is a multidisciplinary collaborative project between King’s College London and Imperial College London which aims to develop a new research field of plasmon-enhanced microscopic electronic phenomena.

Zayats is the holder of the ERC Advanced Grants Integrated Plasmonic Metamaterials  (2013-2018) and Integrating Complex Beams and Metasurfaces (2018-2023).

Zayats is most known for his contributions to the development of  nano-optics of surface plasmon polaritons, nonlinear plasmonics and nanophotonics, hyperbolic and epsilon-near-zero metamaterials and their applications in ultrasensitive bio- and chemical sensing and nonlinear optics, plasmonic hot-electrons for photochemical transformations as well photonic spin-orbit effects in nanophotonics for directional routing of guided modes, directional optical forces and discovery of photonic skyrmions.

Zayats serves as a member of the Data Storage Institute's Scientific Advisory Board.

Zayats is a founding co-editor-in-chief of the SPIE-Chinese Laser Press journal Advanced Photonics.

In 2017, he co-founded the London Institute for Advanced Light Technologies, a joint virtual research centre between King's College London, Imperial College London and University College London, focusing on the emerging topics in optical research, and in particular providing an interdisciplinary and collaborative environment and a framework for interactions with the photonic industry, and training for PhD students.

Publications
His publications include:

Awards and honours
2018 - Distinguished Lecture in Transformative Science and Engineering (Nanjing University, China)
2014 - Fellow of the Royal Society of Chemistry (FRSC)
2013 - Royal Society Wolfson Research Merit Award
2012 - Fellow of SPIE
2008 - Fellow of The Optical Society
2006 - Fellow of the Institute of Physics (FInstP)

Personal life
Zayats has two children with the engineer and academic Polina Bayvel.

References

Academics of King's College London
British people of Ukrainian-Jewish descent
British physicists
1963 births
Living people